Taiwan Province (PFS: Thòi-vàn-sén or Thòi-vân-sén) is a nominal administrative division of the Republic of China (ROC). The province remains a titular division as part of the Constitution of the Republic of China, but it is no longer considered to have any administrative function practically.

Taiwan Province covers approximately 69% of the island of Taiwan, and comprises around 31% of the total population.  The province initially covered the entire island of Taiwan (Formosa), Penghu (the Pescadores), Orchid Island, Green Island, Xiaoliuqiu Island, and their surrounding islands. Between 1967 and 2014, six special municipalities (Kaohsiung, New Taipei, Taichung, Tainan, Taipei and Taoyuan) were split off from the province, all in the most populous regions.

Taiwan was initially made a prefecture of Fujian Province by the Qing dynasty of China after its conquest of the Kingdom of Tungning in 1683. Following the French offensive in northern Taiwan during the Sino-French War, the island's strategic position in maritime security and defence was re-evaluated and given prominence by the Qing. Under the auspices of Liu Ming-chuan, a plan was commenced to develop Taiwan into a stand-alone division. In 1887, Taiwan was designated as a distinct province (namely "Fujian-Taiwan Province"), with Liu as the first governor, but the island was then ceded to the Empire of Japan in 1895, following China's defeat in the First Sino-Japanese War. After the surrender of Japan in World War II, the province was re-established on Taiwan by the Kuomintang (KMT)-led Nationalist Government in September 1945 and it became the last stronghold of the KMT government after their defeat in the Chinese Civil War. The provincial capital of Taipei has correspondingly become the provisional capital of the ROC central government since 1949. 

During the constitutional reform initiated in 1996, the ROC authorities decided to downsize the provincial structure to solve the problem of overlapping personnel and administrative resources between the provincial and central governments, and cut excessive public spending. The provinces were streamlined and ceased to be self-governing bodies in December 1998, with their administrative functions transferred to the Executive Yuan's subsidiary National Development Council, as well as second-tier local governments such as counties. In July 2018, all provincial governmental organs were formally abolished, with their budget and personnel removed.

History

Qing Empire
In 1683, Zheng Keshuang (third ruler of the Kingdom of Tungning and a grandson of Koxinga), surrendered to the Qing Empire following a naval engagement with Admiral Shi Lang. The Qing then ruled the Taiwanese archipelago (including Penghu) as Taiwan Prefecture of Fujian Province. In 1875, Taipeh Prefecture was separated from Taiwan Prefecture. In 1885, work commenced under the auspices of Liu Ming-chuan to develop Taiwan into a province. In 1887, the island was designated as a province (officially "Fujian-Taiwan Province"; Chinese: 福建臺灣省), with Liu as the first governor. The province was also reorganized into four prefectures, eleven districts, and three sub-prefectures. The provincial capital, or "Taiwan-fu", was intended to be moved from the south (modern-day Tainan) to the more central area of Toatun (modern-day Taichung) in the revamped Taiwan Prefecture. As the new central Taiwan-fu was still under construction, the capital was temporarily moved north to Taipeh (modern-day Taipei), which eventually was designated the provincial capital.

Empire of Japan
In 1895, the entire Taiwan Province, including Penghu, was ceded to Japan following the First Sino-Japanese War through the Treaty of Shimonoseki. Under Japanese rule, the province was abolished in favour of Japanese-style divisions. After the surrender of Japan in 1945, the Taiwan was handed over to the Republic of China (ROC).

Republic of China

The ROC government immediately established the Taiwan Provincial Government under first Chief Executive and government-general Chen Yi in September 1945. Chen was extremely unpopular and his rule led to an uprising – the February 28 Incident of 1947. Chen was recalled in May 1947 and the government-general position was abolished.

When the Republic of China government was relocated to Taipei in 1949 as a result of the Kuomintang's (KMT) defeat by the Chinese Communist Party forces in the Chinese Civil War, the provincial administration remained in place under the claim that the ROC was still the government of all of China even though the opposition argued that it overlapped inefficiently with the national government.

The seat of the provincial government was moved from Taipei to Zhongxing New Village in 1956. Historically, Taiwan Province covers the entire island of Taiwan and all its associated islands. The city of Taipei was split off to become a province-level special municipality in 1967, and the city of Kaohsiung was split off in 1979 to become another special municipality. In December 2010, Kaohsiung County left the province and merged with the original Kaohsiung City to become an expanded Kaohsiung City, Taipei County became the special municipality named New Taipei City. The cities and counties of Taichung and Tainan were also merged, respectively, and elevated to special municipality. On 25 December 2014, Taoyuan County was upgraded into a special municipality and split off from Taiwan Province.

Until 1992, the governor of Taiwan province was appointed by the ROC central government. The office was often a stepping stone to higher office.

In 1992, the post of the governor of the province was opened to election. The then-opposition Democratic Progressive Party (DPP) agreed to retain the province with an elected governor in the hopes of creating a "Yeltsin effect" in which a popular local leader could overwhelm the national government. These hopes proved unfulfilled as then-Kuomintang member James Soong was elected governor of Taiwan province, defeating the DPP candidate Chen Ding-nan.

In 1997, as the result of an agreement between the KMT and the DPP, the powers of the provincial government were curtailed by constitutional amendments. The post of provincial governor was abolished. In addition, the provincial council was also replaced by the Taiwan Provincial Consultative Council. Although the stated purpose was administrative efficiency, Soong and his supporters claim that it was actually intended to impede James Soong's political life, though it did not have this effect.

The provincial administration was downscaled in 1998, most of its power handed to the central government. The counties and provincial cities under the province became the primary administrative divisions of the country.

Government

The position of the Chairperson of the Provincial Government, appointed by the central government, is retained to comply with the Constitution.

The major operations of the provincial government, such as managing provincial highways and the Bank of Taiwan, have been transferred to the Executive Yuan since 1998. In July 2018, all remaining duties were transferred to the National Development Council and other ministries of the Executive Yuan.

The Taiwan Provincial Government was located in Zhongxing New Village, Nantou City, Nantou County between 1957 and 2018.

Divisions

History of divisions 

In October 1945, The government of the Republic of China reformed the eight(8) Japanese prefectures under the Government-General of Taiwan into 8 counties and 9 cities.

Current divisions 
Taiwan Province is nominally divided into 11 counties  and 3 cities . All divisions are directly administered by the central government in practice.

Note that the special municipalities of Kaohsiung, New Taipei, Taichung, Tainan, Taipei and Taoyuan are both nominally under and directly administered by the central government. They are not part of any province.

Sister states/provinces 
Taiwan Province is twinned with 42 U.S. states:

Territorial disputes 

The People's Republic of China (PRC) regards itself as the "successor state" of the Republic of China (ROC), which the PRC claims no longer legitimately exists, following establishment of the PRC in mainland China. The PRC asserts itself to be the sole legitimate government of China, and claims Taiwan as its 23rd province, even though the PRC itself has never had control of Taiwan or other ROC-held territories. The ROC disputes this position, maintaining that it still legitimately exists and that the PRC has not succeeded it.

The PRC claims the entirety of the island of Taiwan and its surrounding islets, including the Penghu, as parts of its Taiwan Province, corresponding to the ROC's Taiwan Province before the special municipalities were split off. The PRC claims that Taiwan is part of China, that the PRC succeeded the ROC as the sole legitimate authority in all of China upon its founding in 1949, and that therefore Taiwan is part of the PRC.

The Senkaku Islands, which are currently administered by Japan, are disputed by both the ROC and PRC, which claim them as the Tiaoyutai/Diaoyu Islands. The ROC government claims them as part of Toucheng Township, Yilan County.

See also 

 Fujian Province, Republic of China
 History of the Republic of China
 Politics of the Republic of China
 Political status of Taiwan
 Chinese Taipei
 "Taiwan, China" – A political term used by the People's Republic of China
 Taiwan Province, People's Republic of China

Notes

References

Further reading
 Bush, R. & O'Hanlon, M. (2007). A War Like No Other: The Truth About China's Challenge to America. Wiley. 
 Bush, R. (2006). Untying the Knot: Making Peace in the Taiwan Strait. Brookings Institution Press. 
 Carpenter, T. (2006). America's Coming War with China: A Collision Course over Taiwan. Palgrave Macmillan. 
 Cole, B. (2006). Taiwan's Security: History and Prospects. Routledge. 
 Copper, J. (2006). Playing with Fire: The Looming War with China over Taiwan. Praeger Security International General Interest. 
 Federation of American Scientists et al. (2006). Chinese Nuclear Forces and U.S. Nuclear War Planning
 Gill, B. (2007). Rising Star: China's New Security Diplomacy. Brookings Institution Press. 
 Shirk, S. (2007). China: Fragile Superpower: How China's Internal Politics Could Derail Its Peaceful Rise. Oxford University Press. 
 Tsang, S. (2006). If China Attacks Taiwan: Military Strategy, Politics and Economics. Routledge. 
 Tucker, N.B. (2005). Dangerous Strait: the U.S.-Taiwan-China Crisis. Columbia University Press.

External links 

 Taiwan Provincial Government official site 
 Local government structures by the Department of Civil Affairs, Ministry of Interior, ROC

Provinces of the Republic of China (1912–1949)
1945 establishments in China
1945 establishments in Taiwan
States and territories established in 1945
Subdivisions of Taiwan